Morley is a city in Scott County, Missouri, United States. The population was 697 at the 2010 census.

History
Morley was platted in 1868. The community has the name of J. H. Morley, a railroad official. A post office called Morley has been in operation since 1869.

Geography

Demographics

2010 census
As of the census of 2010, there were 697 people, 284 households, and 195 families living in the city. The racial makeup of the city was 94.98% White, 1.15% Black or African American, 0.43% Native American, and 3.44% from two or more races. Hispanic or Latino of any race were 1.72% of the population.

There were 284 households, of which 32.4% had children under the age of 18 living with them, 48.2% were married couples living together, 15.1% had a female householder with no husband present, 5.3% had a male householder with no wife present, and 31.3% were non-families. 26.8% of all households were made up of individuals, and 12.4% had someone living alone who was 65 years of age or older. The average household size was 2.43 and the average family size was 2.92.

The median age in the city was 40.9 years. 24.1% of residents were under the age of 18; 8.1% were between the ages of 18 and 24; 23.6% were from 25 to 44; 27% were from 45 to 64; and 17.1% were 65 years of age or older. The gender makeup of the city was 47.1% male and 52.9% female.

2000 census
As of the census of 2000, there were 792 people, 315 households, and 219 families living in the city. The population density was 1,070.9 people per square mile (413.2/km). There were 340 housing units at an average density of 459.7 per square mile (177.4/km). The racial makeup of the city was 98.23% White, 0.76% African American, 0.25% Native American, and 0.76% from two or more races. Hispanic or Latino of any race were 0.76% of the population.

There were 315 households, out of which 34.3% had children under the age of 18 living with them, 54.9% were married couples living together, 10.8% had a female householder with no husband present, and 30.2% were non-families. 26.0% of all households were made up of individuals, and 12.1% had someone living alone who was 65 years of age or older. The average household size was 2.50 and the average family size was 2.98.

In the city the population was spread out, with 26.8% under the age of 18, 5.8% from 18 to 24, 28.4% from 25 to 44, 24.1% from 45 to 64, and 14.9% who were 65 years of age or older. The median age was 36 years. For every 100 females there were 91.3 males. For every 100 females age 18 and over, there were 92.7 males.

The median income for a household in the city was $26,696, and the median income for a family was $35,000. Males had a median income of $25,625 versus $17,917 for females. The per capita income for the city was $12,679. About 10.9% of families and 15.4% of the population were below the poverty line, including 15.5% of those under age 18 and 20.2% of those age 65 or over.

Education
The Morley schools were located in the southeastly part of the village, the earliest was built about 1915.  In 1940, a new high school was built in which students attended through 1959 when the consolidation with the Vanduser schools occurred.  The new high school became Scott County Central High School, and was built on Highway 61 south of the village near Kluges Hill.

References

Cities in Scott County, Missouri
Cities in Missouri
Populated places established in 1868
1868 establishments in Missouri